Ranganayaki Ammal (28 May 1910 – 15 August 1998) was an Indian Mridangam player. She received a Kalaimamani award.

References

1910 births
1998 deaths
Recipients of the Kalaimamani Award
Mridangam players
Carnatic musicians
Carnatic instrumentalists
Indian women musicians